Polyptychus claudiae is a moth of the  family Sphingidae. It is known from Sumbawa in Indonesia.

References

Polyptychus
Moths described in 2001